Mark Galli (b. August 24, 1952) is an American Roman Catholic author and editor, and former Protestant minister. For seven years he was editor in chief of Christianity Today.

Biography
Galli, a native of California, was raised as a Roman Catholic, but became a born-again Evangelical at the age of thirteen. He subsequently graduated at the University of California at Santa Cruz and received a M.Div. from Fuller Theological Seminary. He was a Presbyterian pastor for ten years, but later converted to Evangelical Anglicanism, joining the Episcopal Church and moving to the Anglican Church in North America in 2009. 

Moving into journalism, he was the associate editor of Leadership and editor of Christian History, a sister publication of Christianity Today. For the next 20 years he worked for Christianity Today in various capacities, including seven years as editor in chief. In October 2019 he announced he would retire effective January 3, 2020. 

He wrote books and editorials about the nature of the Evangelical faith, including how belief relates to political activity. In 2011, Roger E. Olson, a theologian specializing in Christian ethics, described Galli as, "a serious evangelical scholar with an irenic approach to controversial material", that being defined as favoring and operating toward peace, moderation, or conciliation.

In 2020, Galli announced that he had rejoined the Catholic Church.

Controversies
On December 19, 2019, a day after the U.S. House of Representatives voted to file two articles of impeachment against President Donald Trump, Galli wrote an editorial entitled, "Trump Should Be Removed from Office." The publication noted that the criticisms of Trump were consistent with the magazine's approach to the impeachment proceedings of presidents Richard Nixon and Bill Clinton. 

On 15 March 2022, Christianity Today published an article denouncing “demeaning, inappropriate, and offensive behavior” by Galli during his tenure as editor of the magazine, using only anonymous, uncorroborated sources.[14]. Speaking to Religion News Service, Galli denied the serious charges and offered to meet with his accusers to seek reconciliation.

Rod Dreher wrote in The American Conservative that Christianity Today's investigation on Galli raises great concerns. In his article Dreher quotes the views of others that Galli has been victimized by a shallow attempt at justice. "Due process involves presumption of innocence, right to face your accuser, opportunity to mount a defense, rules of evidence, witnesses, etc."

On November 4, 2022, Galli announced in his newsletter that he was taking an extended sabbatical from writing and public life to concentrate on artistic pursuits.

Books
 With Craig Brian Larson, Preaching that Connects, Zondervan, 1994, 
 With James Stuart Bell Jr., The Complete Idiot's Guide to Prayer, Alpha Books, 1st ed. 1999 ; 2nd ed. 2004, 
 With Ted Olsen, 131 Christians Everyone Should Know, Broadman & Holman, 2000 
 Francis of Assisi and His World, InterVarsity Press, 2002, 
 Jesus Mean and Wild: The Unexpected Love of an Untamable God, Baker Publishing Group, 2006,  
 Beyond Smells and Bells: The Wonder and Power of Christian Liturgy, Paraclete Press, 2008, 
 God Wins: Heaven, Hell, and Why the Good News Is Better than Love Wins, Tyndale, July, 2011.  The Christian Post described God Wins as a "response" to pastor Rob Bell's book Love Wins.
 Chaos and Grace: Discovering the Liberating Work of the Holy Spirit, Baker Publishing Group, October 2011, 
 Karl Barth: An Introductory Biography for Evangelicals, William B. Eerdmans Publishing Company, 2017, 
 With All The Saints. My Journey to the Roman Catholic Church, Word on Fire, 2022,

References

Further reading
 

1952 births
Living people
American Anglican Church in North America members
Former evangelicals
Converts to Anglicanism from Presbyterianism
Converts to Roman Catholicism from Anglicanism
American Roman Catholics
Roman Catholic writers
Editors of Christian publications
University of California, Santa Cruz alumni
Fuller Theological Seminary alumni
Writers from California
American male non-fiction writers
20th-century American non-fiction writers
20th-century American male writers
21st-century American non-fiction writers
21st-century American male writers